The Recinte Mundet, also known as the Llars Mundet, Hogares Mundet or Campus Mundet, is an area of the Spanish and Catalan city of Barcelona, within the district of Horta-Guinardó and neighbourhood of Montbau.

It originally housed a charitable institution, founded in 1957 by the Catalan-Mexican philanthropist Artur Mundet, which cared for orphans, the elderly, sick and needy. Today it houses a campus of the University of Barcelona, together with various educational and social services of the Barcelona Provincial Council.

Mundet station, on line L3 of the Barcelona Metro, is a five-minute walk from the campus.

References

External links
 
 El Campus Mundet, un entorn per descobrir, Edicions UB, 2008 (in Catalan) 

Horta-Guinardó
University of Barcelona